Igor Matveyevich Kostolevsky (born 10 September 1948) is a Soviet and Russian stage and film actor. He has received the People's Artist of Russia title in 1995. Kostolevsky is best known for starring in the films Teheran 43 and The Captivating Star of Happiness.

Biography

Early life and career
Igor Kostolevsky was born September 10, 1948 in Moscow, the son of Matvey Matveyevich Kostolevsky and Vitta Semyonovna Kostolevskaya. His family is Jewish.

After graduation he worked as a tester at the Research Institute of Quartz Industry for two years.

In 1967-1968 he studied at the Moscow Construction Institute.

In 1973 he graduated from GITIS, the course of Andrei Goncharov. In the same year he entered the troupe of the Mayakovsky Theatre.

Igor Kostolevsky played more than 50 roles in the theater, including Misha Rumyantsev ("Relatives" of Emil Braginsky and Eldar Ryazanov), Metchik ("The rout" of Alexander Fadeyev), Treplev ("The Seagull" Anton Chekhov), Golubkov ("Running" Mikhail Bulgakov), Barber King ("Look who came!" Vladimir Arro), Valery ("Man in his place" Valentina Chernykh), Pigusov ("Flying birds" by Alexander Galina), Vasily Leonidovich ("Fruits of Enlightenment" by Leo Tolstoy), Torvald Helmer ("The Dollhouse" by Henrik Ibsen) and others.

Since the 1990s, he has also played on the stages of other theaters, took part in the performance of the international troupe Oresteia Aeschylus, staged in Bergen, Norway, by the director Roche (roles of Apollo, Messenger and the Old Man). In 1994, Kostolevsky played Apollo in "Oresteia" staged by Peter Stein at the Russian Army Theatre.

Film career
In his student years, Igor Kostolevsky began to act in films. He made his debut in Boris Nirenburg's drama The Family as a Family, where the main roles were performed by the then popular actors of the Vakhtangov Theatre Lyudmila Tselikovskaya and Alexander Grave.

In 1975, Vladimir Motyl's film The Captivating Star of Happiness was released where Kostolevsky starred as Ivan Annenkov. The picture was a great success with the audience.

The critics rated the actor highly in the films Spring Appeal (1976) directed by Pavel Lyubimov and Asya (1977) by Joseph Kheifits. Then followed the work in the multi-part film And It's All About Him ... based on the novel by Vilya Lipatov, for the main role in which the actor received the Lenin Komsomol Prize.

Among other significant works Kostolevsky in the cinema in the 1970s was the role of the teacher of astronomy Marina Mioryu in the melodrama of Mikhail Kozakov's Nameless Star and one of the shareholders of the cooperative in the comedy Eldar Ryazanov The Garage. The actor received popularity for the role of Soviet scout Andrei Borodin in the film.

Igor Kostolevsky played more than 60 roles in the cinema. He starred in the films The Dawns Here Are Quiet (1972), A Man Changes Skin (1978), Leave at Your Own Cost (1981), The Tony Wendis Error (1981), Companions (1983) Before Parting (1984), Night Whispers (1985), Through Main Street with an Orchestra (1986), Gobsek (1987), Entrance to the Labyrinth (1989), Lust for Passion (1991), The Ladder of Light (1992), Tango on Palace Square (1993), Nimbus (1994), Square (1995), Another Woman, Another Man (2003), Spy Games (2004-2008), War and Peace (2007), The Time of Happiness (2008), The Blue as the Sea of Eyes (2009), The Tower (2010), and others.

Personal life
Igor Kostolevsky's first wife was actress Elena Romanova. Their son Alexey was born in 1983. The second wife of Igor Kostolevsky is the French actress Consuelo de Aviland.

Honors
Igor Kostolevsky received the title People's Artist of the Russian Federation in 1995.

Laureate of the Lenin Komsomol Prize (1978), laureate of the State Prize of Russia (2000), holder of the Order of Honor (2004), awarded the Order of Merit for the Fatherland, IV Degree (2009).

He was chosen as best actor of 1986 in the poll of the magazine Soviet Screen.

Filmography

References

External links 

1948 births
Living people
20th-century Russian male actors
21st-century Russian male actors
Communist Party of the Soviet Union members
Russian Academy of Theatre Arts alumni
Honored Artists of the RSFSR
People's Artists of Russia
Recipients of the Lenin Komsomol Prize
Recipients of the Order "For Merit to the Fatherland", 4th class
Recipients of the Order of Honour (Russia)
State Prize of the Russian Federation laureates
Jewish male actors
Jewish Russian actors
Russian male film actors
Russian male stage actors
Russian male voice actors
Soviet male film actors
Soviet male stage actors
Soviet male voice actors
Russian activists against the 2022 Russian invasion of Ukraine